Tahuneh may refer to the following places in Iran:
 Tahuneh, Darab, Fars Province
 Tahuneh, Jahrom, Fars Province
 Tahuneh, Hormozgan
 Tahuneh, Kerman
 Tahuneh, Yazd

See also
Tahunet Elhalawa, a village in Syria
Tahuna (disambiguation)